Cláudio Rafael da Veiga Vieira Tavares (born 23 March 1997) is a professional footballer who plays as a rightback for União de Santarém. Born in Portugal, he represents the Cape Verde national team.

Club career
Tavares made his professional debut with Aves in a 2–1 Primeira Liga loss to S.L. Benfica on 10 January 2020.

International career
Born in Portugal, Tavares is of Cape Verdean descent. He represented the Cape Verde national team in a 1–1 2022 FIFA World Cup qualification tie with Central African Republic on 1 September 2021.

Personal life
Tavares' brother Miguel and Jair Tavares, and his cousin Renato Sanches are also professional footballers.

References

External links

Cláudio Tavares at ZeroZero

1997 births
Living people
Footballers from Lisbon
Cape Verdean footballers
Cape Verde international footballers
Portuguese footballers
Portuguese people of Cape Verdean descent
Association football fullbacks
Primeira Liga players
Segunda Divisão players
C.D. Aves players